Dystopia: The Tree of Language is the debut Korean studio album by South Korean girl group Dreamcatcher. It was released on February 18, 2020, by Dreamcatcher Company, and distributed by Kakao M. Dystopia: The Tree of Language features fourteen tracks including the lead single "Scream", and is available in four versions: "E", "V", "I" and "L". Dystopia: The Tree of Language is the start of Dreamcatcher's Dystopia series and was followed by the group's fifth EP Dystopia: Lose Myself, and sixth EP Dystopia: Road to Utopia. Commercially, the album sold over 59,899 copies.

Background and promotion
On January 23, 2020, it was reported that Siyeon would release the pre-release single “Paradise” on January 29. Dreamcatcher was also preparing for a group comeback, and this single would tell a new story that would lead directly into the group's new release.

On February 3, the group released the teaser schedule for their first studio album Dystopia: The Tree of Language. From February 4 to 12, the group revealed individual and group teaser images. On February 12, the group revealed a “lyrics spoiler” video, containing a snippet of the instrumentals of "Scream", and the "album story" spoiler. On February 13, the group shared a highlight medley for the album.

On February 14 and February 17, a dance preview and music video teaser for "Scream" was released respectively.

Critical reception 

Writing for Allkpop, Eric Wirsing remarked: "Despite all these tracks, there is very little filler. Every song is pretty much classic Dreamcatcher in one way or another. While there are some deviations from the formula, they still killed it."

Composition

Music and lyrics
The standard edition of Dystopia: The Tree of Language is about forty-two minutes long. Dystopia: The Tree of Language was written and produced by 0to1, Chairmann, Dami, Hi5, JiU, Kim Bo Eun, LEEZ, Ollounder, Siyeon and Yoohyeon among others. At fourteen tracks, the album is the longest Korean material in Dreamcatcher's catalogue. Musically, Dystopia: The Tree of Language is a rock record with influences of EDM. Members Dami, JiU and Siyeon participated in the writing of "Black or White".  Members Dami, JiU, Siyeon and Yoohyeon participated in the writing of "Jazz Bar". Siyeon participated in the composing and writing of "Paradise".

Songs
Filled with strong and electrifying beats, “Scream” contains a story with a motif of witch hunts in the Middle Ages. “Red Sun” is a warning and lesson told through hypnosis to people who do not admit to their faults.

Soompi described "Paradise" as an electronic pop track that "gives a comforting message to the lonely people of modern society". "Scream" combines rock with electronica and is "motivated by the practice of witch hunts during the medieval period, and the scream before the chorus accentuates this motif".

Track listing 
The following tracklist was adapted from the official released highlight medley.

Accolades

Charts

References

2020 albums
Dreamcatcher (group) albums
Korean-language albums
Kakao M albums